Muhamad Samikidin (died 1965) was an Indonesian politician. He served as the First Secretary of the Aceh Committee of the Communist Party of Indonesia (PKI).

Samikidin was executed in 1965.

References

1965 deaths
Communist Party of Indonesia politicians
Executed communists
Year of birth missing